Camp Smith is a military installation of the New York Army National Guard in Cortlandt Manor near Peekskill, NY, about  north of New York City, at the northern border of Westchester County, and consists of . Established in 1882 by General Frederick Townsend, Adjutant General of New York, it was formerly known as "Camp Townsend", but was renamed in 1919 to "Camp Smith" for Governor Alfred E. Smith of New York.

The camp has been used as an annual training site for National and State Guard regiments since its establishment, and recently has served as the home of the Empire State Military Academy, as well as the state's Non-Com, Officer Candidate School, and a Westchester County DES satellite fire training center. It also hosts some other units (e.g. The Headquarters and Headquarters Detachment of the 53rd Troop Command, 42nd Infantry Division Band, 138th Chaplain Support Team).

References

External links
 Camp Smith official site

Installations of the United States Army National Guard
Buildings and structures in Westchester County, New York
Townsend family
Installations of the United States Army in New York (state)